The Senior Deputy Speaker is an officer of the House of Lords whose main role is to preside over the House when it is in committee (i.e., considering a bill at committee stage), either in the Lords Chamber or in Grand Committee, which is when committee stage is taken away from the floor to free up debating time in the main Chamber. The Senior Deputy Speaker deputises for the Lord Speaker, and like the Lord Speaker withdraws from political party membership. Additionally, the Senior Deputy Speaker chairs various select committees of the House, and has a role in the administration of the House.

The current incumbent, John Gardiner, Lord Gardiner of Kimble, took the office on 11 May 2021. Up until September 2016 the position was known as Chairman of Committees.

The Senior Deputy Speaker is assisted by a panel of Deputy Chairmen of Committees. In addition to taking the chair in Committee of the Whole House and Grand Committee, Deputy Chairmen are appointed from time-to-time to serve with the Chairman of Committees on unopposed bill committees, which scrutinise private bills against which no petitions have been lodged. Deputy Chairmen are, by practice, Deputy Speakers.

In March 2020, the Lord Speaker, Lord Fowler, announced that, due to the coronavirus pandemic, he would be withdrawing from Westminster and leaving woolsack duties to his deputies. On Monday 23 March the house agreed to a motion that, until 21 July, any member could perform the deputy speakers' functions.

Panel of deputy chairmen
The following table lists the panel of Deputy Chairmen of Committees as of October 2022. Where applicable, a peer's concurrent term as a Deputy Speaker is also noted.

Chairmen of Committees
Edward Hyde, 3rd Earl of Clarendon, 1715–1723
John West, 7th/16th Baron De La Warr, 1724–1733
Edward Rich, 8th Earl of Warwick, 1733–1759
Hugh Willoughby, 15th Baron Willoughby of Parham, 1759–1765
Nathaniel Booth, 4th Baron Delamer, 1765–1770
Edward Noel, 1st Viscount Wentworth, 1770–1774
William Irby, 1st Baron Boston, 1774–1775
Nathaniel Curzon, 1st Baron Scarsdale, 1775–1789
William Cathcart, 9th Lord Cathcart, 1789–1794
Thomas de Grey, 2nd Baron Walsingham, 1794–1814
Cropley Ashley-Cooper, 6th Earl of Shaftesbury, 1814–1851
John Freeman-Mitford, 2nd Baron Redesdale, 1851–1886 (created Earl of Redesdale, 1877)
Richard Grenville, 3rd Duke of Buckingham and Chandos, 1886–1889
Albert Parker, 3rd Earl of Morley, 1889–1905
William Onslow, 4th Earl of Onslow, 1905–1911
Richard Hely-Hutchinson, 6th Earl of Donoughmore, 1911–1931
Richard Onslow, 5th Earl of Onslow, 1931–1944
George Hamilton-Gordon, 2nd Baron Stanmore, 1944–1946
Henry Moore, 10th Earl of Drogheda, 1946–1957
William Lewis, 3rd Baron Merthyr, 1957–1965
William Hare, 5th Earl of Listowel, 1965–1976
Morys Bruce, 4th Baron Aberdare, 1976–1992
Geoffrey Russell, 4th Baron Ampthill, 1992–1994
Terence Boston, Baron Boston of Faversham, 1994–2000
John MacKay, Baron MacKay of Ardbrecknish, 2000–2001
Geoffrey Tordoff, Baron Tordoff, 2001–2002
Ivon Moore-Brabazon, 3rd Baron Brabazon of Tara, 2002–2012
John Sewel, Baron Sewel, 2012–2015
Herbert Laming, Baron Laming, 2015–2016

Senior Deputy Speakers
John McFall, Baron McFall of Alcluith, 2016–2021
John Gardiner, Baron Gardiner of Kimble, 2021–present

See also
 List of committees of the United Kingdom Parliament

References

External links
The records of Chairman of Committees are held by the UK Parliamentary Archives

Committees of the House of Lords